"Box of Secrets" is the second single by singer/songwriter Zarif and the second single taken from her debut album Box of Secrets. The song contains samples from the song "Sing, Sing, Sing" by Louis Prima and the commercial single version contains a rap from Mz Bratt.

Background
"Box of Secrets" originally featured on an advert for Sky1 in 2009 and later was released as a free download for a limited time period. In 2010, it was released as the second single from Zarif's debut album, also titled Box of Secrets on 16 August 2010, following her departure from RCA / Sony BMG. It will be released on her own label, Bright Pink Records. The single and video version of the song features a new rap by British MC Mz Bratt.

Promotion
Zarif performed "Box of Secrets" on GMTV in 2009.

Music video
The music video for "Box of Secrets" premiered on 2 June 2010 on Zarif's YouTube account. The video was directed by Andy Hylton and Mz Bratt features in the video.  The video features Zarif walking into a photo booth, which transports her to several 1920s Jazz age scapes.

Track listings

Digital download
 "Box of Secrets" (featuring Mz Bratt) (Radio Edit) - 3:42
 "Box of Secrets" (Original Mix) - 3:42
 "Box of Secrets" (Redlight Remix) - 3:31
 "Box of Secrets" (Cyantific & Wilkinson Remix) - 5:24
 "Box of Secrets" (Midland Remix) - 6:51
 "Box of Secrets" (Ripper Remix) - 5:36

Reviews
The Guardian - "a vaudevillian big band extravaganza"

External links
 Sky1 advert featuring 'Box of Secrets'
 www.zarif.co.uk
 Zarif on RCA Records' website

References

2009 songs
2010 singles
Zarif (singer) songs
Songs written by Louis Prima
RCA Records singles